Sertitympanum is a genus of mites in the family Ameroseiidae. There are about eight described species in Sertitympanum.

Species
These eight species belong to the genus Sertitympanum:
 Sertitympanum aegyptiacum Nasr & Abou-Awad, 1986
 Sertitympanum contiguum Elsen & Whitaker, 1985
 Sertitympanum exarmatum Elsen & Whitaker, 1985
 Sertitympanum mexicanum Villegas-Guzman, Montiel-Parra, Vargas & Polaco, 2004
 Sertitympanum nodosum Sheals, 1962
 Sertitympanum palmatum Nasr & Abou-Awad, 1986
 Sertitympanum separationis Elsen & Whitaker, 1985
 Sertitympanum zaheri El-Badry, Nasr & Hafez, 1979

References

External links

 

Ameroseiidae
Articles created by Qbugbot